The 2011 Nürburgring Superbike World Championship round was the tenth round of the 2011 Superbike World Championship. It took place on the weekend of September 2–4, 2011 at Nürburgring, Germany. The second race here turned out to be James Toseland's last race, as a crash aggravated the injury he picked up at Motorland Aragón earlier in the year and was forced to retire.

Results

Superbike race 1 classification

Superbike race 2 classification
The race was red-flagged after 13 laps because of heavy rain.

Supersport race classification

References

Nurburgring Round
Nurburgring Superbike
Sport in Rhineland-Palatinate